Michael Francis (born 1976) is a British conductor.

Biography
Francis learnt the double bass as a youth.  He was a member of the European Union Youth Orchestra, and graduated in 1997 from The Cardiff University School of Music.  He played the double bass for the London Symphony Orchestra before he began conducting. His first public performance as conductor of a major orchestra occurred in January 2007 when he deputised for Valery Gergiev.

In Europe, Francis became chief conductor and artistic adviser to the Norrköping Symphony Orchestra in 2012, and held the post through 2016.  In December 2016, Francis first guest-conducted the Staatsphilharmonie Rheinland-Pfalz.  In December 2018, the Staatsphilharmonie Rheinland-Pfalz announced the appointment of Francis as its next chief conductor, effective with the 2019-2020 season, with an initial contract of 5 years.

In the USA, Francis became music director of The Florida Orchestra as of the 2015-2016 season, with an initial contract of 3 years.  His current contract with The Florida Orchestra is through 2025.  He became music director of the Mainly Mozart Festival (San Diego, California, USA) in the summer of 2015.

Francis lives in Florida with his American wife Cindy and their daughter.

References

External links
 Official homepage of Michael Francis
 KD Schmid agency profile of Michael Francis
 Interview bei Classicpoint.net
 Cardiff University Alumni Profile
 Feenotes.com Profile
 
 

British male conductors (music)
Living people
British double-bassists
Male double-bassists
Alumni of Cardiff University
1976 births
Welsh conductors (music)
London Symphony Orchestra players
21st-century British conductors (music)
21st-century double-bassists